William Charles Vahland (born Carl Wilhelm Vahland; 2 October 1828 – 21 July 1915) was a German-trained Australian architect who, after migrating to Bendigo in 1854 and becoming an Australian citizen on 20 July 1857, became known as the "premier architect of the Victorian goldfields". 

Vahland designed over 200 buildings in North Central Victoria, including many of Bendigo's largest public and private buildings. By encouraging other European artisans and artists to emigrate to Bendigo, Vahland's aim was to realise a vision of the city as the "Vienna of the South".

References

External links
 "A short biography of William Vahland" by Robyn Ballanger

19th-century Australian architects
1828 births
1915 deaths
People from Nienburg, Lower Saxony